Rhode Island elected its members August 27, 1822.

See also 
 1822 and 1823 United States House of Representatives elections
 List of United States representatives from Rhode Island

1822
Rhode Island
United States House of Representatives